Kristy Wright (born 14 July 1978; name also erroneously given as Kirsty Wright) is an Australian television and film actress.

Biography
Wright was born in Sydney, Australia, the oldest child in her family, with three stepbrothers and two half-sisters. Hoping to win a contest for acting lessons, she sent in her photograph and ended up with a full year's paid tuition. Her first part was a guest role in Police Rescue. From 1995 until 1999 she played the part of Chloe Richards in the Australian soap opera Home and Away and briefly returned to this role in June 2005, when her character died from an embolism resulting from a car accident.

Following Home and Away she starred in Chuck Finn, Above the Law and Something in the Air. She went on to feature in Crash Palace as well as a political satire called Corridors of Power. Following this success she was picked up to feature in an American TV show, Beastmaster as a ninja warrior. She also appeared in a short film, Sweet Dreams.

She worked on an episode of Sir Arthur Conan Doyle's – The Lost World, and has also featured in the Australian drama, The Alice. She had a minor role as the hand maiden Moteé in Star Wars: Episode III – Revenge of the Sith.

She moved to Los Angeles in 2006 to pursue acting in Hollywood as the logical next step in her career. However, she eventually decided to quit acting in order to focus on other interests and start a family. 
On 8 August 2013, she gave birth to Jai Wright (né Jacoby), during her 27th week of pregnancy. Jai weighed in at only 2 lbs 4 oz and 14 1/2 inches long.
She is a single mother and has since moved back to Australia with her son.

Filmography

Film

Television

References

External links
 

1978 births
Australian film actresses
Australian television actresses
Living people
Actresses from Sydney